Ron Groce (July 1, 1954 – March 21, 2018) was an American football running back. He played for the Minnesota Vikings in 1976.

He died on March 21, 2018, in Minneapolis, Minnesota at age 63.

References

1954 births
2018 deaths
Players of American football from Minneapolis
American football running backs
Macalester Scots football players
Minnesota Vikings players